Seraphine Sng Sin Pei, also known as Seraph Sun, is a Singaporean former actress. She was a full-time Mediacorp artiste from 2013 to 2017. She won the "Ms Popularity" title in S.N.A.P. in 2012, and starred in dramas such as Peace & Prosperity and films such as Miss J Contemplates Her Choice. Sun left Mediacorp in October 2017 to marry her Japanese husband.

Early life
Sun graduated with Honours in Sociology from National University of Singapore. She had been acting in numerous school plays, and started part-time modelling with Upfront Models during her university days. She is effectively trilingual and studied in Osaka, Japan.

Career
Sun was talent-spotted in Marina Square during the filming of S.N.A.P. in 2012, and in 2013, was offered a MediaCorp contract. She made her acting debut in the web drama portion of 96°C Café with a small role, and became a guest host on Style: Check-in 3. With her Japanese language skills, she was soon given the opportunity to participate in the gameshow Find The Wasabi, a special collaboration with Japan TBS Station.

In 2014, Sun made her film debut in Miss J Contemplates Her Choice, starring as the younger version of Kit Chan's role. She also filmed 118 & made an cameo appearance in a toggle original series, Mystic Whisper that landed her nomination for Best Newcomer in Star Awards 2015.

In 2015, she filmed Life Is Beautiful and had a breakthrough where she scored a major role in Hand In Hand, along with other veteran actors like Bryan Wong and Jesseca Liu. She was one of the Sheng Siong hosts of outdoor cooking after actress Tracy Lee left the entertainment industry.

In 2016, she involved in a long running drama series, Peace & Prosperity where she lands her nomination for Top 10 Most Popular Female Artistes in Star Awards 2017. In 2017, she had filmed Dream Coder and will be relocated to Tokyo after her marriage on 14 October 2017. She left the entertainment industry in October 2017, but has since relocated back to Singapore. She is currently a digital content editor at a media startup.

Filmography

TV series

Variety show appearances

TV hosting

Accolades

References

External links
 

1988 births
Living people
Singaporean television personalities
21st-century Singaporean actresses
Singaporean television actresses
National University of Singapore alumni